Same-sex marriage in North Dakota became legal following the U.S. Supreme Court's ruling in Obergefell v. Hodges on June 26, 2015, which invalidated state bans on same-sex marriage throughout the United States. Until then, North Dakota had restricted marriage to the union of one man and one woman both by statute and in its State Constitution.

Legal history

Restrictions on same-sex unions
North Dakota voters adopted a constitutional amendment in November 2004 that defined marriage as the union of a man and a woman and prohibited the recognition of same-sex relationships as well as civil unions and domestic partnerships. State statutes also banned same-sex marriage.

Following the U.S. Supreme Court's ruling in Obergefell v. Hodges on June 26, 2015, a judiciary committee of the North Dakota Legislature began examining the possibility of removing the now-invalid statutory and constitutional restrictions on same-sex unions in the state. The committee said it would not make any recommendations until at least January 2017. On January 10, 2017, the North Dakota Senate rejected Senate Bill 2043, which would have replaced references to "husband and wife" in state statutes with gender-neutral references to "two people". The bill was rejected by 31 votes to 15, and came after the committee had canvassed the issue though been unable to come to a formal recommendation. Kelly Armstrong, the chair of the North Dakota Republican Party, voted in favor, but said that the measure was "only symbolic" since same-sex marriage is legal in North Dakota, "I think it's a pretty drastic over-estimation that we would end up in litigation if we don't pass this bill."

Lawsuits
On June 6, 2014, seven same-sex couples filed a federal lawsuit against North Dakota officials, seeking the right to marry and recognition of marriages performed in other jurisdictions. Five of the couples had married in other states and one couple in Canada. The suit, Ramsay v. Dalrymple, was brought by Minneapolis civil rights attorney Joshua A. Newville, who filed a similar lawsuit on behalf of six same-sex couples in South Dakota on May 22, 2014. First-named defendant Governor Jack Dalrymple filed a motion to dismiss on July 1. The plaintiffs filed a motion for summary judgment on July 22. Briefing was completed by September 5. Lambda Legal filed a similar lawsuit, Jorgensen v. Montplaisir, on June 9, 2014 on behalf of two women, residents of Fargo, who had married in Minnesota. On January 20, 2015, U.S. District Court Judge Ralph R. Erickson stayed proceedings in both cases pending the outcome of several same-sex marriage cases in the U.S. Supreme Court.

On June 26, 2015, the U.S. Supreme Court ruled in Obergefell v. Hodges that the denial of marriage rights to same-sex couples violates the Due Process and Equal Protection clauses of the Fourteenth Amendment to the United States Constitution, legalizing same-sex marriage nationwide in the United States. Governor Dalrymple issued a one-sentence statement that acknowledged the decision and said the state would comply, "The U.S. Supreme Court has ruled that same-sex marriage is legal throughout the nation, and we will abide by this federal mandate." Same-sex couples began marrying in North Dakota immediately following the Supreme Court's ruling, with Jesse Masterson and Trever Hill being the first same-sex couple to file marriage paperwork at the Cass County Clerk's Office on June 26. Attorney General Wayne Stenehjem said the state might have to wait for Judge Erickson to issue a ruling lifting the stay he had issued in January, but Newville said there was "no question" about whether same-sex couples had the right to marry in North Dakota, with or without an order from Judge Erickson. Stenehjem nonetheless said that the ruling "overrides any conflicting state, constitutional or statutory provisions".

On June 29, Judge Erickson lifted the stay he had issued in Jorgensen and declared North Dakota's constitutional and statutory restrictions on access to marriage by same-sex couples and the recognition of such marriages from other jurisdictions invalid.

State Representative Joshua Boschee welcomed the court ruling, saying that it creates a more compassionate environment for LGBT people, "I think back to, even my own youth, when you didn't have any out people around and you had nobody to look up to. LGBT and their straight friends now live in a country where the full rights and responsibility of marriage are afforded to everyone." Senator Heidi Heitkamp said, "Today is an historic day for equal rights, for justice, and for individuals and couples across the country who can no longer be treated differently because of who they love." A group of supporters gathered outside the Grand Forks County Courthouse to celebrate the court ruling. Among them, former State Senator JoNell Bakke who said she had been "waiting for this to happen for quite some time". "There's still going to be pushback from the state, obviously. But this sets the tone that if it's legal to be married, it's illegal to discriminate against [people who identify as gay].", Bakke said. Opponents of same-sex marriage said they were disappointed. Senator John Hoeven said "I, like many others across America, am disappointed by today's Supreme Court ruling approving same-sex marriage, and believe as a matter of religious principle that marriage is the union between one man and one woman.", despite the United States being a secular state. Kevin Cramer, U.S. Representative for North Dakota's at-large congressional district, said the ruling was "another example of activist judges overstepping their authority".

Native American nations
In August 2020, the Tribal Council of the Turtle Mountain Band of Chippewa Indians legalized same-sex marriage by a vote of 6–2, making it the first Native American tribe in North Dakota to do so. The Council replaced all references to "husband and wife" with "spouses" in the Tribal Code.

The Law and Order Code of the Spirit Lake Tribe states that marriages consummated by tribal custom are valid, but requires that the parties declare in the presence of the officiant that they take each other as "husband and wife". The Law and Order Code of the Standing Rock Sioux Tribe provides that "for a man and a woman to be married under this chapter" they must be at least 18 years old, or 16 if they have obtained the consent of their parents or guardians, and freely consent themselves. The code also states that any marriage validly contracted in the United States, any tribe, state, or foreign nation shall be "for all purposes" recognized as valid by the Standing Rock Sioux Tribe.

Dakota culture has traditionally recognized two-spirit people who were born male but wore women's clothing and performed everyday household work and artistic handiwork which were regarded as belonging to the feminine sphere. Many  married cisgender men, without indicating of polygyny, but some remained unmarried and lived in their own tipis, and were visited by married men for sexual intercourse when the men's wives were pregnant or menstruating, and therefore when sexual intercourse was forbidden to them. Similarly, the Hidatsa and the Arikara peoples of the Mandan, Hidatsa, and Arikara Nation have traditionally recognized two-spirit people who crossed out of the masculine gender. Hidatsa  performed handiwork such as beadwork and quillwork. They also commonly took in orphans from their tribe or children captured on raids, were allowed to access ceremonial groups reserved to women, and were important for the preparation of the traditional Sun Dance.  were sometimes wives in polygynous households but also established their own households with older, unmarried, childless men and filled out the household with adoptive children. The two-spirit status thus allowed for marriages between two biological males to be performed in these tribes.

Demographics and marriage statistics
Data from the 2000 U.S. census showed that 703 same-sex couples were living in North Dakota. By 2005, this had increased to 1,070 couples, likely attributed to same-sex couples' growing willingness to disclose their partnerships on government surveys. Same-sex couples lived in all counties of the state, except Hettinger and Slope counties, and constituted 0.5% of coupled households and 0.3% of all households in the state. Most couples lived in Cass, Burleigh and Grand Forks counties, but the counties with the highest percentage of same-sex couples were Logan (0.73% of all county households) and Oliver (0.63%). Same-sex partners in North Dakota were on average older than opposite-sex partners, and less likely to be employed. The average and median household incomes of same-sex couples were lower than different-sex couples, and same-sex couples were also far less likely to own a home than opposite-sex partners. 40% of same-sex couples in North Dakota were raising children under the age of 18, with an estimated 424 children living in households headed by same-sex couples in 2005.

As of November 30, 2015, approximately 60 marriage licenses had been issued to same-sex couples in the state. Of North Dakota's 53 counties, 18 had issued at least one marriage license to a same-sex couple, with most issued in Cass, Grand Forks, Burleigh and Ward counties. As of January 5, 2016, approximately 75 marriage licenses had been issued to same-sex couples in North Dakota since legalization on June 26, 2015. This accounted for over 1.5% of the number of marriage licenses issued in the state in that time.

Public opinion
In a poll conducted by Forum Communications and the University of North Dakota's College of Business and Public Administration in October 2014, 50% of North Dakota voters opposed the legalization of same-sex marriage and 37% supported it. Some 9% reported they were neutral and 5% had no opinion. According to an earlier report by the Williams Institute, support for same-sex marriage had been 23% in 2004 and 40% in 2012.

A poll conducted by the Public Religion Research Institute (PRRI) in 2015 found that 43% of North Dakotans supported same-sex marriage, 44% opposed and 13% did not know or refused to answer. In 2016, the PRRI found that 46% of North Dakotans supported same-sex marriage, another 46% opposed and 8% were undecided or refused to answer. In 2017, the PRRI found majority support for same-sex marriage in North Dakota; 53% of respondents agreed that same-sex couples should be allowed to legally marry, while 35% were opposed and 12% were unsure.

A PRRI survey conducted between January 7 and December 20, 2020 on 151 random telephone interviewees showed that 55% of respondents supported same-sex marriage, while 45% were opposed. A survey conducted by the same polling organization between March 8 and November 9, 2021 showed that 69% of respondents supported same-sex marriage, while 30% opposed and 1% were undecided.

See also
LGBT rights in North Dakota
Same-sex marriage in the United States

References

LGBT in North Dakota
North Dakota
2015 in LGBT history
2015 in North Dakota